De Korenaar is a smock mill in Sexbierum, Friesland, Netherlands which was built in 1868 and is in working order. The mill is listed as a Rijksmonument.

History
De Korenaar was built in 1868, replacing a mill that had burnt down in 1867. It is a corn mill, but was also formerly a pearl barley mill. The mill was restored in 1990-91 by millwright Hiemstra of Tzummarum, Friesland. The mill is listed as a Rijksmonument, No. 8648.

Description

De Korenaar is what the Dutch describe as a "Stellingmolen". It is a smock mill on a brick base. The smock and cap are thatched. The mill is winded by tailpole and winch. The sails are Common sails. The sails are carried on a cast-iron windshaft. The windshaft also carries the brake wheel, which has 57 cogs. This drives the wallower (28 cogs) at  the top of the upright shaft. At the bottom of the upright shaft is the great spur wheel, which has 100 cogs. The great spur wheel drives a pair of French Burr millstones via a lantern pinion stone nut which has 24 staves and a pair of Cullen millstones via a lantern pinion stone nut which has 26 staves. The millstones are  diameter.

Public access
De Korenaar is open to the public on Saturdays between 11:00 and 17:00, Sundays between 13:00 and 17:00, or by appointment.

External links
De Korenaar website

References

Windmills in Friesland
Windmills completed in 1868
Smock mills in the Netherlands
Grinding mills in the Netherlands
Agricultural buildings in the Netherlands
Rijksmonuments in Friesland
Octagonal buildings in the Netherlands